Behind the Iron Mask is a musical with a book by Colin Scott and Melinda Walker and music and lyrics by John Robinson. It played a short run at the Duchess Theatre in London after receiving unanimously unfavorable reviews. Especially unique, this show has a cast of only three actors but runs for two hours. The show draws inspiration from Alexandre Dumas' Man in the Iron Mask.

Musical numbers

Act I
 Tristesse
 Antiphonal Madness
 There Is Sweet Music
 Possession - Prelude
 Do You Look for Love?
 Pearls, Pearls, Pearls
 Touch Me - Prelude
 Darkness
 The Enigma
 You'll Never Leave Here
 Possession

Act II
 Prelude to Love/Can't You See
 Turmoil
 Who's the Prisoner Here?
 Touch Me
 Take Me as I Am
 I'm a Lady/In a Single Moment
 Shadowland of Life/Touch Me - Reprise
 Tristesse
 Where Are You?
 If All This Means Love

Original cast

References

2005 musicals
West End musicals